Mediavia internigralis is a species of snout moth in the genus Mediavia. It was described by Paul Dognin in 1909. It is found in French Guiana.

References

Moths described in 1909
Epipaschiinae